The following list includes all current and former arenas used by current and defunct teams playing in the National Basketball League (NBL) during the 2021–22 NBL season. The New Zealand Breakers, South East Melbourne Phoenix and Tasmania JackJumpers all use multiple home venues. Other information included in this list are arena locations, seating capacities, years opened and in use.

The Qudos Bank Arena, home to the Sydney Kings and the largest indoor arena in Australia, has the highest capacity of any current NBL arena at 18,200. Opening in 2019, Nissan Arena, home to the Brisbane Bullets is the newest venue in use. The oldest venue in use is the Silverdome, having opened in 1984.

Two of the venues used in the NBL, RAC Arena and John Cain Arena, the main home venue for the two Melbourne teams, are both retractable roof venues.

Current main arenas

Secondary arenas

Future or proposed arenas

Former arenas

Defunct teams

See also

List of A-League stadiums
List of Australian Football League grounds
List of Australian cricket grounds
List of ice rinks in Australia
List of indoor arenas in Australia
List of National Rugby League stadiums
List of Australian rugby league stadiums
List of Australian rugby union stadiums
List of soccer stadiums in Australia
List of Oceanian stadiums by capacity

References

External links

Basketball League (Australia) venues
National Basketball League (Australia) venues
venues